Tallygaroopna is a closed railway station on the Goulburn Valley line, in the township of Tallygaroopna, Victoria, Australia. The station opened at the same time as the railway line from Shepparton to Numurkah on 1 September 1881. The passenger platform was shortened in length from 107.3m to 101.2m in 1973. The siding to the grain silos was lifted at an unknown date.

References

Disused railway stations in Victoria (Australia)